The 2009–10 Air21 Express season was the eighth season of the franchise in the Philippine Basketball Association (PBA). In the Philippine Cup, they were known as Burger King Whoppers.

Key dates
August 2: The 2009 PBA Draft took place in Fort Bonifacio, Taguig.

Draft picks

Roster

Philippine Cup

Eliminations

Standings

Game log

Eliminations

|- bgcolor="#edbebf" 
| 1
| October 11
| Purefoods
| 80–93
| Lanete (14)
| Quiñahan (10)
| Lanete, Quiñahan (4)
| Araneta Coliseum
| 0–1
|- bgcolor="#bbffbb" 
| 2
| October 16
| Smart Gilas*
| 115–105
| Buenafe (25)
| Belga (11)
| Buenafe (7)
| Araneta Coliseum
| 
|- bgcolor="#edbebf" 
| 3
| October 21
| San Miguel
| 99–117
| R. Yee (17)
| R. Yee (10)
| Billones (6)
| Cuneta Astrodome
| 0–2
|- bgcolor="#bbffbb"
| 4
| October 24
| Rain or Shine
| 91–89
| Buenafe (22)
| Belga, R. Yee  (10)
| Lanete (6)
| Gingoog, Misamis Oriental
| 1–2
|- bgcolor="#edbebf" 
| 5
| October 30
| Sta. Lucia
| 93–101
| David (23)
| R. Yee  (11)
| Buenafe, Lanete (4)
| Araneta Coliseum
| 1–3

|- bgcolor="#edbebf" 
| 6
| November 6
| Alaska
| 73–87
| Buenafe (15)
| Quiñahan (9)
| Buenafe (5)
| Cuneta Astrodome
| 1–4
|- bgcolor="#edbebf" 
| 7
| November 14
| Barangay Ginebra
| 79–83
| Matias (12)
| R. Yee (9)
| R. Yee (5)
| Tubod, Lanao del Norte
| 1–5
|- bgcolor="#bbffbb" 
| 8
| November 18
| Coca Cola
| 106–97
| M. Yee, Buenafe (19)
| Belga (10)
| Belga, Williams (4)
| Araneta Coliseum
| 2–5
|- bgcolor="#bbffbb" 
| 9
| November 20
| Barako Bull
| 102–86
| Buenafe (17)
| Quiñahan, M. Yee (7)
| Quiñahan (7)
| Araneta Coliseum
| 3–5
|- bgcolor="#edbebf" 
| 10
| November 27
| Talk 'N Text
| 105–118
| David (24)
| Sharma (6)
| David (4)
| Ynares Center
| 3–6
|- bgcolor="#edbebf" 
| 11
| November 29
| San Miguel
| 85–100
| R. Yee (14)
| Matias (8)
| Buenafe, Quiñahan (4)
| Ynares Sports Arena
| 3–7

|- bgcolor="#bbffbb" 
| 12
| December 6
| Rain or Shine
| 101–99
| M. Yee (21)
| Quiñahan (9)
| Lanete (5)
| Araneta Coliseum
| 4–7
|- bgcolor="#edbebf" 
| 13
| December 11
| Talk 'N Text
| 104–115
| David (26)
| Quiñahan, M. Yee (7)
| Quiñahan, 2 others (4)
| Ynares Center
| 4–8
|- bgcolor="#edbebf" 
| 14
| December 13
| Coca Cola
| 94–106
| David (23)
| Buenafe (7)
| Lanete, M. Yee (3)
| Araneta Coliseum
| 4–9
|- bgcolor="#bbffbb" 
| 15
| December 18
| Barako Bull
| 102–99
| R. Yee (21)
| Quiñahan (12)
| Billones (5)
| Araneta Coliseum
| 5–9
|- bgcolor="#edbebf" 
| 16
| December 25
| Purefoods
| 74–85
| Belga (15)
| Belga, R. Yee (7)
| Lanete (6)
| Cuneta Astrodome
| 5–10

|- bgcolor="#edbebf" 
| 17
| January 8
| Sta. Lucia
| 79–83
| Cabagnot (17)
| Cabagnot (9)
| Williams (4)
| Cuneta Astrodome
| 5–11
|- bgcolor="#edbebf"  
| 18
| January 17
| Barangay Ginebra
| 104–122
| Belga (17)
| Quiñahan (7)
| Cabagnot (7)
| Araneta Coliseum
| 5–12
|- bgcolor="#bbffbb"
| 19
| January 20
| Alaska
| 87–80
| Quiñahan (23)
| Quiñahan (10)
| Cabagnot (7)
| Cuneta Astrodome
| 6–12

Playoffs

|-  bgcolor="#edbebf" 
| 1
|  January 24
|  Coca Cola
|  112–118
|  Buenafe (27)
|  R. Yee (12)
|  Buenafe (5)
|  Ynares Center
|  0–1

Fiesta Conference

Eliminations

Standings

Game log

Transactions

Pre-season

Philippine Cup

Mid-season break

Fiesta Conference

Imports recruited

References

Barako Bull Energy seasons
Air21